Derrin James Bassage (born 4 December 1978) is a former South African first-class cricketer who made 55 appearances for the Western Province and Cape Cobras cricket teams. He made his debut in professional cricket in 2003 and played four seasons of South African domestic cricket, primarily appearing in first-class cricket, but also making a number of appearances in the one-day form of the game. He was born to Carol Ann Bassage (née Cooke) and Jack Bassage.

References

1978 births
Cape Cobras cricketers
Living people
Cricketers from Pietermaritzburg
South African cricketers
Western Province cricketers
Wicket-keepers